The Happening is a 2008 thriller film written, directed, and produced by M. Night Shyamalan. It stars Mark Wahlberg, Zooey Deschanel, John Leguizamo, and Betty Buckley and revolves around an inexplicable natural disaster causing mass suicides. The film premiered in New York City on June 10, 2008, and was theatrically released in the United States by 20th Century Fox on June 13. It was panned by critics and grossed $163 million worldwide.

Plot

In New York City's Central Park, people begin committing mass suicide. The event is believed to be caused by a bio-terrorist attack using an airborne neurotoxin. The behavior quickly spreads across the Northeastern United States. High school science teacher Elliot Moore and his wife Alma are convinced by Elliot's mathematician colleague Julian to accompany him and his daughter Jess on a train out of Philadelphia. During the trip, the group learns that Boston and Philadelphia have been affected. The train loses all radio contact and stops at a small town. When Julian learns that his wife has left Boston for Princeton, he decides to look for her and entrusts Jess to the Moores. However, Julian arrives to find Princeton has been affected, causing the driver in the car he is riding in to ram into a tree. He survives but commits suicide by slitting his wrist with a glass shard.

Elliot, Alma, and Jess hitch a ride with a nurseryman and his wife. The nurseryman theorizes that plant life has developed a defense mechanism against humans consisting of an airborne toxin that stimulates neurotransmitters and causes humans to kill themselves. The group is later joined by other survivors coming from various directions, and the small crowd chooses to avoid roads and populated areas. When the larger part of the group is affected by the toxin, Elliot suggests the nurseryman was right and that the plants are targeting only large groups of people. He splits their group into smaller pockets and they walk along. The trio ends up with a pair of teenage boys, Josh and Jared, who are later shot and killed by the armed residents of a barricaded house.

Elliot, Alma and Jess wander the countryside and come upon the home of Mrs. Jones, an eccentric and paranoid elder. Jones initially agrees to house the group for the night but is suspicious of them having bad intentions; the next morning, she decides to expel them. In a fury, she leaves the house alone and is affected by the toxin. The shaken Elliot realizes that the plants are now targeting individuals. Left with no option when Mrs. Jones strikes her head into several windows, the trio chooses to die and embraces in the yard only to find themselves unaffected by the toxin. The outbreak has abated as quickly as it began.

Three months later, Elliot and Alma have adjusted to their new life with Jess as their adopted daughter. Alma learns she is pregnant and surprises Elliot with the news. On television, an expert compares the natural event to a red tide and warns that the epidemic may have only been a harbinger of an impending global disaster. In Paris's Luxembourg Gardens, people begin committing mass suicide.

Cast
 Mark Wahlberg as Elliot Moore
 Zooey Deschanel as Alma Moore, Elliot's wife
 John Leguizamo as Julian
 Betty Buckley as Mrs. Jones
 Ashlyn Sanchez as Jess, Julian's daughter later Elliot & Alma's adoptive daughter
 Frank Collison as nursery owner
 Victoria Clark as nursery owner
 Spencer Breslin as Josh
 Robert Bailey, Jr. as Jared
 Jeremy Strong as Private Auster
 M. Night Shyamalan as Joey (voice only)

Production

Following the critical and commercial failure of Lady in the Water (2006), M. Night Shyamalan struggled to sell his next spec script entitled "The Green Effect". By January 2007, it was reported that several studios had received the screenplay, but none expressed interest enough to purchase it. As a result, Shyamalan began taking notes and collecting ideas from meetings before returning home to Philadelphia to rewrite his script. In March 2007, the film was purchased as The Happening by 20th Century Fox, Mark Wahlberg joined the cast, and a theatrical release date was set for June 13, 2008. The film is Shyamalan's first R-rated project, which he produced alongside Sam Mercer and Barry Mendel. The India-based company UTV Motion Pictures also financed half of the film's budget. On March 15, 2007, Shyamalan described The Happening as a 1960s paranoia film similar to The Birds and Invasion of the Body Snatchers. Production began in August 2007 in Philadelphia, with filming taking place on Walnut Street, in Rittenhouse Square Park, in Masterman High School, on South Smedley Street, and at the 'G' Lodge in Phoenixville. During post-production, the film score was recorded at the Sony Scoring Stage and composed by James Newton Howard in his sixth collaboration with Shyamalan.

Release

Box office
The marketing campaign for The Happening was noted for its "aggressive" tactics and "great visuals" that successfully intrigued audiences. According to Deadline Hollywood, the film was negatively targeted by several media outlets that began rooting for the film's failure, including USA Today, while also branding Shyamalan as "the hopelessly arrogant has-been". In its opening weekend, the film grossed $30.5 million, including $13 million on its first day and $10.2 million on its second, exceeding expectations and placing third at the box office. Outside the United States and Canada, the film made $32.1 million across 88 international markets in its first three days.

Critical reception
 The website's critical consensus reads, "The Happening begins with promise, but unfortunately descends into an incoherent and unconvincing trifle."  Audiences polled by CinemaScore gave the film an average grade of "D" on an A+ to F scale.

Some critics enjoyed it. Glenn Whipp said, "Tamping down the self-seriousness in favor of some horrific silliness, M. Night Shyamalan's The Happening plays as a genuinely enjoyable B-movie for anyone inclined (or able) to see it that way".

Kirk Honeycutt of The Hollywood Reporter said the film lacked "cinematic intrigue and nail-biting tension" and that "the central menace ... does not pan out as any kind of Friday night entertainment". Variety’s Justin Chang felt that it "covers territory already over-tilled by countless disaster epics and zombie movies, offering little in the way of suspense, visceral kicks or narrative vitality to warrant the retread". Mick LaSalle wrote in his San Francisco Chronicle review that he considered the film entertaining but not scary. He commented, too, on Shyamalan's writing, opining that, "instead of letting his idea breathe and develop and see where it might go, he jumps all over it and prematurely shapes it into a story". James Berardinelli said the film had neither "a sense of atmosphere" nor "strong character development"; he called its environmental message "way-too-obvious and strident," gave it one and a half stars out of a possible four, and concluded his review by saying, "The Happening is a movie to walk out of, sleep through, or—best of all—not to bother with." Time’s Richard Corliss saw the film as a "dispiriting indication that writer-director M. Night Shyamalan has lost the touch". The Chicago Tribunes Michael Phillips thought the film had a workable premise, but found the characters to be "gasbags or forgetful". Joe Morgenstern of The Wall Street Journal said that the film was a "woeful clunker of a paranoid thriller" and highlighted its "befuddling infelicities, insistent banalities, shambling pace and pervasive ineptitude".

Stephen King liked the film, stating: "Of Fox's two summer creepshows [the other being The X-Files: I Want to Believe], give the edge to The Happening, partly because M. Night Shyamalan really understands fear, partly because this time he's completely let himself go (hence the R rating), and partly because after Lady in the Water he had something to prove". Critic Roger Ebert of the Chicago Sun-Times, awarding the movie three stars, found it "oddly touching": "It is no doubt too thoughtful for the summer action season, but I appreciate the quietly realistic way Shyamalan finds to tell a story about the possible death of man". William Arnold of the Seattle Post-Intelligencer called it "something different—and a pleasant surprise" among that summer's major Hollywood releases, and approved of its taking "the less-is-best approach." The New York Times’ Manohla Dargis praised Wahlberg's lead performance, adding that the film "turns out to be a divertingly goofy thriller with an animistic bent, moments of shivery and twitchy suspense". Philipa Hawker of The Age gave it 3.5 out of 5 stars, commenting on "the mood of the film: a tantalizing, sometimes frustrating parable about the menaces that human beings might face from unexpected quarters," drawing special attention to "the sound of the breeze and the sight of it ruffling the trees or blowing across the grass — an image of tension that calls to mind Antonioni's Blowup". Richard Roeper of the Chicago Sun-Times said, "It almost dares you to roll your eyes or laugh at certain scenes that are supposed to be deadly serious. But, you know what, I appreciated this creatively offbeat, daring sci-fi mind-trip". Reviewer Rumsey Taylor said that the film moves forward with "jack-in-the-box suspense, traipsing from one garish death to another in a parade of cartoonish terror," and noted how the film seemed like "Alfred Hitchcock’s The Birds, only without the birds."

The Happening has also attracted academic attention. Joseph J. Foy, professor of politics and popular culture, describes Shyamalan's film as an expression of "post-environmentalism" in which traditional paradigmatic politics are replaced with a call for the world to "embrace a revolutionary reevaluation of wealth and prosperity not in terms of monetary net worth or material possessions, but in terms of overall well-being". Foy praises the highly complex narrative in which Shyamalan weaves contemporary environmental challenges with hard science and social theory to create a "nightmarish future that... may advance the type of dialogue that can truly change the cultural conversation".

Responses of cast and crew 
On June 7, 2008, days before the first few reviews for the film came online, Shyamalan told the New York Daily News: "We're making an excellent B movie, that's our goal".

Wahlberg offered his own opinion of The Happening in 2010, saying that Amy Adams, who was in consideration for the role of Alma Moore, had "dodged the bullet" by not starring in the film. He said, "It was a really bad movie... F**k it. It is what it is... You can’t blame me for not wanting to try to play a science teacher. At least I wasn’t playing a cop or a crook." About Wahlberg's reaction, Shyamalan said he is fine with his opinion: "Since that would be the only case of that happening — no. But really, no. It’s totally his call. However he wants to interpret it."

In 2019, Shyamalan said that he took some responsibility for the way the movie turned out: "I think it's a consistent kind of farce humor. You know, like The Blob. The campy, 1958 debut of actor Steve McQueen, featuring a mysterious, growing amoeba that takes over a small Pennsylvania town. The key to The Blob is that it just never takes itself that seriously. I think I was inconsistent. That's why they couldn't see it." In 2022, Deschanel also defend the movie: “The director, M. Night Shyamalan – Night – had a strong vision and we were all trying to do what he wanted. I trusted him, because he’s a great filmmaker. I didn’t know until I saw the film, but I think he was going for a stylized horror, like ‘The Birds,’ and maybe people didn’t get that.”

Awards 
The film was nominated for four Golden Raspberry Awards: Worst Picture, Worst Actor for Mark Wahlberg (also for Max Payne), Worst Director, and Worst Screenplay for M. Night Shyamalan. The film was also nominated for Best Horror Film at the Saturn Awards but lost to Hellboy II: The Golden Army.

The Happening came in eighth in a 2010 poll by Empire magazine of "50 Worst Movies of All Time", and first in a 2012 poll by SFX magazine of "50 Worst Sci-fi & Fantasy Movies That Had No Excuse".

Re-evaluation as a B-movie 
In 2016, Ignatiy Vishnevetsky of The A.V. Club said that it was "Patterned on the B movies of the early atomic age, the best of which could be sophisticated in everything except premise and acting, the movie swaps out radiation for climate change, but otherwise keeps to the template, complete with an ending in which a man in a suit explains everything that happened, but not really." He further stated "Sometimes, it mimics the goofiness of authentic ’50s B movies; this is one of those cases where the miscasting—namely, Mark Wahlberg as a Philadelphia science teacher who looks and talks like a football coach who’s been forced to sub sex ed—seems at least partly intentional. And yet, even with its non sequitur references to food (tiramisu, hot dogs, “lemon drink,” etc.) and its winks of self-parody (e.g., Wahlberg talking to a plastic plant), The Happening is a movie that a lot of people presume is trying and failing to be taken seriously. And maybe it is." He further summarized that "... in The Happening, everything is premised on the assumption that life is meaningless—a deep anxiety that informs the movie’s abstracted scare scenarios, but is also hidden behind camp. It’s not incoherent, but it’s often hard to read. It’s a genuine curio, not entirely successful, and if you subscribe to the old auteurist line of movies being both expressions and entertainment objects, it’s both too self-consciously silly and too personal to dismiss."  

On its 10th year anniversary, Jeff Spry of Syfy said that M. Night Shyamalan's The Happening is a better B movie 10 years later. He summarized that "The Happening contains some genuinely moving sequences, gruesome slaughter, a few intimate moments that truly resonate, and some laugh-out-loud scenes that defy explanation (see: a confused man is being eaten by hungry lions). While it's overacted in many spots and completely bonkers in others, it's a fascinating mix of eco-didacticism, post 9/11 trauma, spaced-out Zooey Deschanel, Cabbage Patch doll jokes, mood rings, math riddles, hot dog love, and silly, unsophisticated screenwriting based on shaky pseudo-science."

In 2018, Craig Lines of Den of Geek said that "Just about every aspect of The Happening is a defiance of expectation. It uses the tropes of classic disaster/survival B-Movies (Shyamalan clearly knows his classics) but inverts them. The pacing of the film, for example, moves in reverse. It starts off quite fraught and slows down further and further as it goes on. By the time it reaches its (anti)climax, it’s become almost motionless with fewer words, longer takes, extended periods of stillness and silence; a vastness you can almost feel." He summarized that "The script here is so carefully constructed, so multi-layered and so rhythmic it’s almost poetry. The fact that much of the dialogue was deemed simply ridiculous by audiences saddens me because every word feels so perfectly in place."

On its 10th year anniversary, Chris Evangelista of Slashfilm noted that the film deserved to be recognized as a B-Movie classic. He said that "It’s time to embrace the movie for what it really is: an intentionally goofy, highly entertaining B-movie that should be celebrated for its own stupid charms rather than mercilessly mocked and scorned."

In 2020, Lindsay Traves of Bloody Disgusting said that it was a deadpan comedy in disguise featuring numerous trope parodies and summarised that "The Happening gave us a film that wasn’t about any real killer, but hinted it might be about nationalism, post 9/11 fears and American paranoia. Then it dared us to ask if we should take it seriously."

In 2020, Scott Mendelson of Forbes summarized that "The Happening is unique unto itself, is rarely boring and has aged well in terms of being a bonkers/original premise delivered with a relatively straight-face (and just a hint of knowing camp). At its core, the Mark Wahlberg/Zooey Deschanel sci-fi chiller is essentially 'What if one of our more genuinely talented directors made a big-budget, R-rated Ed Wood movie?' Shyamalan is nothing if not sincere, and while he’s attempting a modern-day version of a 1950’s sci-fi warning movie, the film is absolutely invested in its mother nature is tired of humanity’s bullshit premise."

Home media
As of August 2020, the DVD units sold have generated over US$22.4 million in revenue.

Notes

References

External links

 
 

2008 films
2008 horror films
2000s disaster films
2000s English-language films
2000s horror thriller films
2000s psychological horror films
2008 psychological thriller films
2000s science fiction horror films
American disaster films
American horror thriller films
American natural horror films
American science fiction horror films
American supernatural horror films
American supernatural thriller films
Indian disaster films
Indian horror thriller films
Indian science fiction horror films
Indian supernatural horror films
Indian supernatural thriller films
English-language Indian films
Apocalyptic films
Environmental films
Films about educators
Films about families
Films about plants
Films about suicide
Indian films set in New York City
Films set in Paris
Films set in Philadelphia
Films shot in New York City
Films shot in Paris
Films shot in Philadelphia
Films about mind control
20th Century Fox films
Blinding Edge Pictures films
Dune Entertainment films
Spyglass Entertainment films
Films scored by James Newton Howard
Films directed by M. Night Shyamalan
Films produced by Barry Mendel
Films produced by M. Night Shyamalan
Films produced by Sam Mercer
Films with screenplays by M. Night Shyamalan
2000s American films